A pole star or polar star is a star, preferably bright, nearly aligned with the axis of a rotating astronomical body.

Currently, Earth's pole stars are Polaris (Alpha Ursae Minoris), a bright magnitude 2 star aligned approximately with its northern axis that serves as a pre-eminent star in celestial navigation, and a much dimmer magnitude 5.5 star on its southern axis, Polaris Australis (Sigma Octantis).

From around 1700 BC until just after 300 AD, Kochab (Beta Ursae Minoris) and Pherkad (Gamma Ursae Minoris) were twin northern pole stars, though neither was as close to the pole as Polaris is now.

History

In classical antiquity, Beta Ursae Minoris (Kochab) was closer to the celestial north pole than Alpha Ursae Minoris.
While there was no naked-eye star close to the pole, the midpoint between Alpha and Beta Ursae Minoris was reasonably close to the pole, and it appears that the entire constellation of Ursa Minor, in antiquity known as Cynosura (Greek Κυνόσουρα  "dog's tail") was used as indicating the northern direction for the purposes of navigation by the Phoenicians. The ancient name of Ursa Minor, anglicized as cynosure, has since itself become a term for "guiding principle" after the constellation's use in navigation.

Alpha Ursae Minoris (Polaris) was described as ἀειφανής (transliterated as aeiphanes) meaning "always above the horizon", "ever-shining" by Stobaeus in the 5th century, when it was still removed from the celestial pole by about 8°. It was known as scip-steorra ("ship-star") in 10th-century Anglo-Saxon England, reflecting its use in navigation. In the Vishnu Purana, it is personified under the name Dhruva ("immovable, fixed").

The name stella polaris was coined in the Renaissance, even though at that time it was well recognized that it was several degrees away from the celestial pole; Gemma Frisius in the year 1547 determined this distance as 3°8'.
An explicit identification of Mary as stella maris with the North Star (Polaris) becomes evident in the title Cynosura seu Mariana Stella Polaris (i.e. "Cynosure, or the Marian Polar Star"), a collection of Marian poetry published by Nicolaus Lucensis (Niccolo Barsotti de Lucca) in 1655.

Precession of the equinoxes

In 2022 Polaris' mean declination is 89.35 degrees North; (at epoch J2000 it was 89.26 degrees N). So it appears due north in the sky to a precision better than one degree, and the angle it makes with respect to the true horizon (after correcting for refraction and other factors) is within a degree of the latitude of the observer. 
The celestial pole will be nearest Polaris in 2100.

Due to the precession of the equinoxes (as well as the stars' proper motions), the role of North Star has passed (and will pass) from one star to another in the remote past (and in the remote future). In 3000 BC, the faint star Thuban in the constellation Draco was the North Star, aligning within 0.1° distance from the celestial pole, the closest of any of the visible pole stars. However, at magnitude 3.67 (fourth magnitude) it is only one-fifth as bright as Polaris, and today it is invisible in light-polluted urban skies.

During the 1st millennium BC, Beta Ursae Minoris ("Kochab") was the bright star closest to the celestial pole, but it was never close enough to be taken as marking the pole, and the Greek navigator Pytheas in ca. 320 BC described the celestial pole as devoid of stars. In the Roman era, the celestial pole was about equally distant between Polaris and Kochab.

The precession of the equinoxes takes about 25,770 years to complete a cycle. Polaris' mean position (taking account of precession and proper motion) will reach a maximum declination of +89°32'23", which translates to 1657" (or 0.4603°) from the celestial north pole, in February 2102. Its maximum apparent declination (taking account of nutation and aberration) will be +89°32'50.62", which is 1629" (or 0.4526°) from the celestial north pole, on 24 March 2100.

Precession will next point the north celestial pole at stars in the northern constellation Cepheus. The pole will drift to space equidistant between Polaris and Gamma Cephei ("Errai") by 3000 AD, with Errai reaching its closest alignment with the northern celestial pole around 4200 AD. Iota Cephei and Beta Cephei will stand on either side of the northern celestial pole some time around 5200 AD, before moving to closer alignment with the brighter star Alpha Cephei ("Alderamin") around 7500 AD.

Precession will then point the north celestial pole at stars in the northern constellation Cygnus. Like Beta Ursae Minoris during the 1st millennium BC, the bright star closest to the celestial pole in the 10th millennium AD, first-magnitude Deneb, will be a distant 7° from the pole, never close enough to be taken as marking the pole, while third-magnitude Delta Cygni will be a more helpful pole star, at a distance of 3° from celestial north, around 11,250 AD. Precession will then point the north celestial pole nearer the constellation Lyra, where the second brightest star in the northern celestial hemisphere, Vega, will be a pole star around 14,500 AD, though at a distance of 5° from celestial north.

Precession will eventually point the north celestial pole nearer the stars in the constellation Hercules, pointing towards Tau Herculis around 18,400 AD.
The celestial pole will then return to the stars in constellation Draco (Thuban, mentioned above) before returning to the current constellation, Ursa Minor. When Polaris becomes the North Star again around 27,800 AD, due to its proper motion it then will be farther away from the pole than it is now, while in 23,600 BC it was closer to the pole.

Over the course of Earth's 26,000-year axial precession cycle, a series of bright naked eye stars (an apparent magnitude up to +6; a full moon is −12.9) in the northern hemisphere will hold the transitory title of North Star. While other stars might line up with the north celestial pole during the 26,000 year cycle, they do not necessarily meet the naked eye limit needed to serve as a useful indicator of north to an Earth-based observer, resulting in periods of time during the cycle when there is no clearly defined North Star. There will also be periods during the cycle when bright stars give only an approximate guide to "north", as they may be greater than 5° of angular diameter removed from direct alignment with the north celestial pole.

The 26,000 year cycle of North Stars, starting with the current star, with stars that will be "near-north" indicators when no North Star exists during the cycle, including each star's average brightness and closest alignment to the north celestial pole during the cycle:

Southern pole star (South Star)

Currently, there is no South Pole Star like Polaris, the so-called North Star. Sigma Octantis is the closest near naked-eye star to the south celestial pole, but at apparent magnitude 5.47 it is barely visible on a clear night, making it less useful for casual navigational or astronomy alignment purposes.
It is a yellow giant 294 light years from Earth. Its angular separation from the pole is about 1°. The Southern Cross constellation functions as an approximate southern pole constellation, by pointing to where a southern pole star would be.

At the equator, it is possible to see both Polaris and the Southern Cross. The celestial south pole is moving toward the Southern Cross, which has pointed to the south pole for the last 2000 years or so. As a consequence, the constellation is no longer visible from subtropical northern latitudes, as it was in the time of the ancient Greeks.

Around 200 BC, the star Beta Hydri was the nearest bright star to the celestial south pole. Around 2800 BC, Achernar was only 8 degrees from the south pole.

In the next 7500 years, the south celestial pole will pass close to the stars Gamma Chamaeleontis (4200 AD), I Carinae, Omega Carinae (5800 AD), Upsilon Carinae, Iota Carinae (Aspidiske, 8100 AD) and Delta Velorum (Alsephina, 9200 AD). From the eightieth to the ninetieth centuries, the south celestial pole will travel through the False Cross. Around 14,000 AD Canopus will have a declination of –82°, meaning it will rise and set daily for latitudes between 8°S and 8°N, and will not rise to viewers north of this latter 8th parallel north.

Precession and proper motion mean that Sirius will be a future southern pole star: at 88.4° S declination in the year 66,270 AD; and 87.7° S declination in the year 93,830 AD.

Other planets
Pole stars of other planets are defined analogously: they are stars (brighter than 6th magnitude, i.e., visible to the naked eye under ideal conditions) that most closely coincide with the projection of the planet's axis of rotation onto the celestial sphere. Different planets have different pole stars because their axes are oriented differently. (See Poles of astronomical bodies.)

 Alpha Pictoris is the south pole star of Mercury while Omicron Draconis is its north star.
 42 Draconis is the closest star to the north pole of Venus. Eta¹ Doradus is the closest to the south pole. (Note: The IAU uses the right-hand rule to define a positive pole for the purpose of determining orientation. Using this convention, Venus is tilted 177° ("upside down").)
 The lunar south pole star is Delta Doradus, and the north pole star Omicron Draconis.
 Kappa Velorum is only a couple of degrees from the south celestial pole of Mars. The top two stars in the Northern Cross, Sadr and Deneb, point to the north celestial pole of Mars.
 The north pole of Jupiter is a little over two degrees away from Zeta Draconis, while its south pole is about two degrees north of Delta Doradus.
 Delta Octantis is the south pole star of Saturn.  Its north pole is in the far northern region of Cepheus, about six degrees from Polaris.
 Eta Ophiuchi is the north pole star of Uranus, and 15 Orionis is its south pole star.
 The north pole of Neptune points to a spot midway between Gamma and Delta Cygni. Its south pole star is Gamma Velorum.

In religion and mythology

In the medieval period, Polaris was also known as stella maris "star of the sea" (from its use for navigation at sea), as in e.g. Bartholomeus Anglicus (d. 1272), in the translation of John Trevisa (1397):

Polaris was associated with Marian veneration from an early time, Our Lady, Star of the Sea being a title of the Blessed Virgin.
This tradition goes back to a misreading of Saint Jerome's translation of Eusebius' Onomasticon,  De nominibus hebraicis (written ca. 390). Jerome gave stilla maris "drop of the sea" as a (false) Hebrew etymology of the name Maria. This stilla maris was later misread as stella maris; the misreading is also found in the manuscript tradition of Isidore's Etymologiae (7th century); it probably arises in the Carolingian era; a late 9th-century manuscript of Jerome's text still has stilla, not stella, but Paschasius Radbertus, also writing in the 9th century, makes an explicit reference to the "Star of the Sea" metaphor, saying that Mary is the "Star of the Sea" to be followed on the way to Christ, "lest we capsize amid the storm-tossed waves of the sea."

In Mandaean cosmology, the Pole Star is considered to be auspicious and is associated with the World of Light ("heaven"). Mandaeans face north when praying, and temples are also oriented towards the north. On the contrary, the south is associated with the World of Darkness.

In Japan, the Pole Star was represented by Myōken Bosatsu (妙見菩薩).

In the Greek Magical Papyri, the Pole Star was identified with Set-Typhon.

In Chinese mythology, Emperor Zhuanxu is mentioned as a god of the Pole Star.

In India (Hindu mythology), the Pole Star is referred as Dhruva, who was a devotee of Vishnu, and was transformed into the immortal star by Vishnu.

See also
Astronomy on Mars § Celestial poles and ecliptic
Astrotheology
Celestial equator
Direction determination
Guide star
Lists of stars

Notes

References

External links

 
 Star trails around Polaris

Navigation
Star types
 
Articles containing video clips